Magog may refer to:

In the Bible
 Magog (Bible), a grandson of Noah in the Old Testament
 Gog and Magog, a Biblical pair

In The Quran
Magog, According to the Qur'an. A corrupter and oppressor, who will come back in the end-times to spread corruption and oppression, once more.
Gog and Magog, Qur'anic and Biblical pair.

Fictional people
 Magog, of Gog and Magog (statues) in Guildhall, London
 Magog ("Magos"), appearing with Gog ("Gos"), in Gargantua

Places in Canada
 Magog, Quebec, a town
 Magog Township, Quebec, a former township
 Magog River, Quebec
 Lake Magog, Quebec
 Mount Magog, on the border between Alberta and British Columbia

Entertainment
 Magog (comics), an anti-hero in DC Comics' Kingdom Come miniseries
 Magog, a 1972 novel by Andrew Sinclair
 Magog, a fallen angel in the Dresden Files novels by Jim Butcher, first appearing in Small Favor
 Guards of Magog, referenced in the song "Supper's Ready" by Genesis on the 1972 album Foxtrot
 Magog, a fictional race of beings from the TV show "Andromeda"

Other uses
 , a Royal Canadian Navy frigate during the Second World War
 Magog, an unaccepted synonym for a genus of sponges Chondrilla (sponge)
 Magog, a nickname given within the Skull and Bones collegiate secret society
 Oaks of Avalon, a pair of oak trees known individually as Gog and Magog, Glastonbury, Somerset, England
 Gog and Magog, twin rock formations in Stewart Island / Rakiura, New Zealand

See also
Gog Magog Hills, a range of hills south of Cambridge, England
Gog (disambiguation)